Varney Monk (born Isabel Varney Desmond Peterson; 18 January 1892 – 7 February 1967) was an Australian pianist and composer, best known for writing the musicals Collits' Inn (1932) and The Cedar Tree (1934). Collits' Inn was described by the Sydney Morning Herald as "an Australian opera".

From families of Scottish heritage and musical ability, her father was a solicitor.  Soon after her birth in Bacchus Marsh, the family moved to Tasmania.  Monk's mother died when Monk was eleven, and her father died in 1929.

During her career she wrote over 150 songs.  Her first song was published at age thirteen, and by 1934, Monk had won the best song in an Australian Radio Competition with 'Some distant day', and the 1933 Broken Hill Jubilee Song Competition.  Using Australian poems as inspiration, she set to music three pieces of verse by Adam Lindsay Gordon (1833–1870), eight by Henry Kendall (1839–1882), two by Will H. Ogilvie (1869–1963), and others by Miles Franklin (1879–1954) and Henry Lawson (1867–1922).

She was the wife of Australian violinist Cyril Monk, whom she married in 1913.  She had one son and one daughter, and lived in Mosman, Sydney in later life.

References

External links 

Papers of Varney Monk at National Library of Australia
Article on the making of Collits' Inn
Varney Monk at Trove
Varney Monk at Ausstage

1892 births
1967 deaths
20th-century Australian musicians
20th-century composers
Australian composers
Australian women composers
Australian musical theatre composers
Australian musical theatre lyricists
Australian songwriters
19th-century Australian women
20th-century Australian women musicians
20th-century women composers